HMS Arachne was an 18 gun  that served in the First Anglo-Burmese War and was sold into merchant service in 1837. She was wrecked in 1848 on the Australian coast.

History
Arachne was laid down in September 1808 and launched on 18 February 1809 by Hills Yard in Sandwich, Kent. In 1824, she was converted to a ship sloop before seeing extensive action in the 1824–26 First Anglo-Burmese War. In January 1837, the Arachne was sold into merchant service.

Sinking
In late May or early June 1848, the Arachne was anchored in Trial Bay, having on board 80 barrels of sperm oil. She sank in Yanerby and called for Trial Bay, however it was too late for the ship was already under. The ship had a crew of 23 and it is known that no people perished when the ship sunk.

The ship is located at coordinates 135°38'.083 E, 32°22'.950 S

References 

 

1809 ships
Brig-sloops of the Royal Navy
Shipwrecks of New South Wales
Maritime incidents in 1848
Cruizer-class brig-sloops